The 18th Annual Anugerah Musik Indonesia was held on September 22, 2015, at the Ecovention in Pademangan, North Jakarta. The show was broadcast live on RCTI and was hosted by Arie Untung.

The show was a collaboration between Anugerah Musik Indonesia Foundation and RCTI. The theme of the show was Stop Pembajakan! (stop piracy). Musicians, singers, and composers were nominated for 53 different awards. The event was divided into three segments: AMI Awards Gala Night, Lifetime Achievement Awards, and The Winner's Concert.

Tulus led the nominations with nine, and also became the biggest winner of the night with six wins, including Best of the Best Album for Gajah, Best of the Best Production Work for "Jangan Cintai Aku Apa Adanya", and Best Pop Male Solo Artist. Other winners included Cita Citata and Trio Lestari, who won three awards. Sheila On 7, Isyana Sarasvati, Andien, Kotak, etc. took home two trophies each.

Bob Tutupoli received the "AMI Legend Award" for his body of work through his career.

Performances

Presenters 
 Fatin Shidqia and Indah Nevertari — Presented Best of the Best Newcomer
 Melody JKT48, Ve JKT48 and Haruka JKT48 — Presented Best Children Female Solo Artist
 GAC — Presented Best Soul/R&B Male/Female Solo Artist
 Ahmad Dhani and Mulan Jameela — Presented Best of the Best Production Work
 Sheila On 7 — Presented Best Pop Vocal Group
 Krisdayanti — Presented Best Contemporary Dangdut Female Solo Artist
 Virzha and Ikang Fauzi — Presented Best Rock Duo/Group
 Tantowi Yahya — Presented Legend Awards
 Zaskia Gotik, Julia Perez and Ayu Ting Ting — Presented Best Dance/Electronic Production Work
 Nidji — Presented Best of the Best Album
 Bebi Romeo and Elvy Sukaesih — Presented Best Pop Female Solo Artist

Nominees and winners 
The nominees were announced on September 11, 2015. Winners are listed first and highlighted in boldface.

Pop

Rock

Jazz/Instrumental

Soul/R&B

Kroncong/Style/Opera

Contemporary Dangdut/Dangdut

Children

Production Work

Field Production Support

General

Artist with most nominations and awards 

The following artist received most nominations:

The following artist received most awards:

References

External links 
 Official sites

2015 in Indonesia
2015 music awards
Indonesian music awards
Anugerah Musik Indonesia